Filippo Crepaldi (born 19 February 1992) is an Italian professional baseball pitcher for the Unipol Bologna of the Italian Baseball League. 

Crepaldi played for the  Italy national baseball team at the 2010 World Junior Baseball Championship and for Team Europe at the 2015 edition of the Asia Winter Baseball League. He also pitched for his club team at the 2013 Asia Series. He was selected to represent Italy at the 2017 World Baseball Classic. He played for Team Italy in the 2019 European Baseball Championship. He is playing for the team at the Africa/Europe 2020 Olympic Qualification tournament, taking place in Italy from 18 September 2019.

References

External links

2016 European Baseball Championship players
2017 World Baseball Classic players
2019 European Baseball Championship players
Baseball pitchers
Italian baseball players
Palfinger Reggio Emilia players
Unipol Bologna players
Living people
1992 births